"Frauen dieser Welt" (Women of this world) is a song written and performed by Funny van Dannen, from the album Groooveman (2002). The song is a tribute to women all around the world.

Die Toten Hosen cover

The song was famously covered by the German punk band Die Toten Hosen for their 2002 compilation album Reich & sexy II: Die fetten Jahre, from which it was released as a single.

The song was first covered in a concert in Rottweil, where only ladies could get in. Due to a popular demand, they decided to release it on an album.
For the single, a cooperation with Funny van Dannen resulted in a new song, "Junge Menschen, alte Menschen" and also another van Dannen song was recorded with the author himself.

On the single, which features a shot of the Rottweil concert as the cover, the name of the band is stylised as Die Toten H♀sen.

Music video
The music video was directed by Olaf Heine.

In the video, different men "talk" about women. The band drives on  the beach of Saint Peter Sued in a car with a loudspeaker on the roof, gathering male followers, till they see a woman on the road in front of them. The band members then get out of the car and go with the mass apparently to say "hello" to her.

Track listing
 "Frauen dieser Welt" (van Dannen/van Dannen) - 3:50
 "Junge Menschen, alte Menschen" (Young people, old people) (van Dannen/Frege, van Dannen) - 3:07
 "Trauriges Arschloch" (Sad asshole) (van Dannen/van Dannen) - 2:52 (with Funny van Dannen; Funny van Dannen cover)

Charts

2002 singles
Die Toten Hosen songs